Seasons Change is an album by saxophonist Lee Konitz and vibraphonist/pianist Karl Berger recorded in Zürich in 1979 and released on the German Circle label.

Track listing 
All compositions by Lee Konitz except where noted.

 "Some Blues" - 4:53
 "Ballad" - 4:47
 "A Tuno for Bruno" - 4:09
 "Standard" - 5:33
 "Talk" (Karl Berger) - 5:02
 "Seasons Change" (Berger) - 4:42
 "Sundance" (Berger) - 2:10
 "Mamidi II" (Berger) - 2:10
 "Taking Time" (Berger) - 3:47
 "Fun (Whole-Half Down 89)" (Berger) - 4:57

Personnel 
Lee Konitz – alto saxophone
Karl Berger – vibraphone, piano

References 

Lee Konitz albums
Karl Berger albums
1980 albums
Circle Records (Germany) albums